DXBG-TV, Channel 8 (analog) and Channel 34 (digital), is a local commercial television station owned and operated by GMA Network Inc. Its studio and transmitter are located at Nuñez St., Brgy. San Isidro, General Santos.

History
GMA General Santos began its broadcast on Channel 5 (DXWP-TV) as an affiliate of Southern TV Industries from 1985 to 1992. GMA General Santos transferred its current regional station to Channel 8 as an owned-and-operated station in 1992 and became a relay station delivering programs from Metro Manila via DZBB-TV.

In 2009, GMA General Santos was relaunched as a satellite station with programs being produced, including the public affairs program Soccsksargen Isyu Karon and the news update Flash Bulletin, both launched in 2010. The station began to co-producing and simulcasting the first ever Mindanao-wide newscast One Mindanao on August 28, 2017. This led to the station becoming a semi-satellite from GMA Davao.

On December 6, 2021, GMA General Santos commenced digital test broadcasts on UHF Channel 34 covering General Santos and the provinces of South Cotabato and Sarangani.

On March 16, 2022, GMA General Santos inaugurated the state-of-the-art facility and studios located at Nuñez St., Brgy. San Isidro, General Santos.

GMA TV-8 General Santos current programs
One Mindanao (Monday to Friday 5:10 PM)
At Home with GMA Regional TV (Monday to Friday 8:00 AM)
Word of God Network (Sunday 6:00 AM)

GMA TV-8 General Santos defunct programs
Flash Bulletin (2010-2015)
Soccsksargen Isyu Karon (2010-2011)
Isyu Mindanao (2012-2014)
Isyu ug Istorya (2014-2015)
Let's Fiesta (2012-2015)
Visita Iglesia (2010-2015)
Biyaheng DO30 (2016-2022)

Personalities

Current
 Jestoni Jumamil - GMA General Santos correspondent
 Abby Caballero 
GMA General Santos selected correspondent carried over to One Mindanao of GMA Davao

Past
 Jennifer Solis (now with Brigada News TV General Santos)
 Sheillene Canda (now with Marketing Manager at SM City General Santos)
 Leigh Fortich (now with DXMD RMN 693 General Santos)
 Michael Carbon (now with DXMD RMN 693 General Santos)
 Fem Nacario (now with DXMD RMN 693 General Santos)
 Rolly Pacquiao (now with 91.1 Pacman Radio)
 Avelino Avel Manansala
 Maryknoll Cabios
 Richard Grande (now with 103.1 Radyo Bandera News FM General Santos)

Digital television

Digital channels
UHF Channel 34 (593.143 MHz)

Areas of coverage 
 General Santos
 South Cotabato
 Sarangani

Rebroadcasters

See also
 Barangay 102.3 General Santos
 List of GMA Network stations

References

GMA Network stations
Television stations in General Santos
Television channels and stations established in 1985
Digital television stations in the Philippines